Lester Smith may refer to:

 Lester Smith (Canadian football)
 Lester W. Smith, creator of Dragon Dice and other dice games
 Lester Smith (swimmer)
 L. Neil Smith, Libertarian science fiction author and political activist
 Lester Smith (philanthropist) (1942-2019), American oil executive and philanthropist